Vice Admiral Sir Henry Karslake Kitson KBE, CB (22 June 1877 – 19 February 1952) was a Royal Navy officer who commanded the 3rd Battle Squadron.

Naval career
Kitson joined the Royal Navy in 1891 and served in World War I. He was made Commander of 3rd Battle Squadron in 1929 and then Admiral Superintendent of Portsmouth Dockyard in 1931 before retiring as a vice-admiral in 1933. He was appointed a Companion of the Order of the Bath in the 1929 Birthday Honours and a Knight Commander of the Order of the British Empire on 3 June 1935.

He also served in World War II as Flag Officer, Coast of Cornwall from 1940 until 1942.

Personal life
In 1926, he married Marjorie de Pass, daughter of Sir Eliot Arthur de Pass.  His brother-in-law Frank de Pass was the first Jewish recipient of the Victoria Cross.

They had two sons, including Sir Frank Kitson.

References

1877 births
1952 deaths
Knights Commander of the Order of the British Empire
Companions of the Order of the Bath
Royal Navy vice admirals
Military personnel from Devon